The Glasgow Bridge was five-span through truss bridge over the Missouri River on Route 240 between Howard County, Missouri and Saline County, Missouri at Glasgow, Missouri.

It was built in 1925 and rehabilitated in 1986.  Its main span was 343.7 feet and its total length was 2,243.5 feet. It had a deck width of 20.3 feet and vertical clearance of 14.8 feet. It was narrowed to a single lane in its final few years (with stoplights on either side) before being closed and replaced in 2008-09. The new bridge reopened in September 2009 and the project was completed in autumn of that year.

See also
List of crossings of the Missouri River

References
Bridgehunter.com profile

Buildings and structures in Howard County, Missouri
Buildings and structures in Saline County, Missouri
Bridges completed in 1925
Road bridges in Missouri
Truss bridges in the United States
Metal bridges in the United States
Bridges over the Missouri River